Mariana Beatriz Scandura (born 2 May 1994) is an Argentinian field hockey player.

Hockey career 
In 2018, Scandura was called into the senior national women's team that won the 2018 South American Games.

References

Living people
1994 births
Argentine female field hockey players
South American Games gold medalists for Argentina
South American Games medalists in field hockey
Competitors at the 2018 South American Games
Sportspeople from Mendoza Province